Bab Zeytun (also Romanized as Bāb Zeytūn and Bāb-e Zeytūn; also known as Bāb Zeytūn-e Bīd Khān) is a village in Mashiz Rural District, in the Central District of Bardsir County, Kerman Province, Iran. At the 2006 census, its population was 772, in 187 families.

References 

Populated places in Bardsir County